The Premio 40 Principales for Best Spanish Festival, Tour or Concert (often shortened to Best Tour), is an honor presented annually at Los Premios 40 Principales. Although it is regarded as a Spanish award, international stars such as Maná or U2 have won it. Possibly due to the exceptional circumstances caused by the COVID-19 pandemic, the award was absent from the 2020 ceremony, and eventually replaced with new Best Live Act category in 2021.

References

Spanish music awards
Los Premios 40 Principales
Awards established in 2006